Magdalena Mortęska (1554–1631), was a Polish Roman Catholic nun of the Benedictine order.

She was Abbess in the Benedictine Nunnery in Chełmno. She was a Catholic mystic, and a writer of religious literature.

She is regarded a Servant of God.

References

 Karol Górski: Matka Mortęska. Kraków: Społeczny Instytut Wydawniczy „Znak”, 1971, seria: Ludzie i czasy, nr 7. OCLC 927019319.

1554 births
1631 deaths
16th-century Polish Roman Catholic nuns
17th-century Polish Roman Catholic nuns
Mortęski family